Miroslav Stevanović (born 29 July 1990) is a Bosnian professional footballer who plays as a winger for Swiss Super League club Servette and the Bosnia and Herzegovina national team.

Stevanović started his professional career at Vojvodina, who loaned him to Palić in 2009 and to Borac Banja Luka in 2010. In 2013, he was transferred to Sevilla, who sent him on loan to Elche later that year and to Alavés a year later. In 2014, he signed with Győr. The following year, Stevanović switched to Ergotelis. He joined Željezničar in 2016. A year after, he moved to Servette.

A former youth international for Bosnia and Herzegovina, Stevanović made his senior international debut in 2012, earning over 20 caps since.

Club career

Early career
Stevanović started playing football at his hometown club Drina Zvornik, before joining youth academy of Serbian team Vojvodina in 2008. In July 2009, he was sent on six-month loan to Palić, with whom he made his professional debut and scored his first professional goal. In January 2010, he was loaned to Borac Banja Luka until the end of season.

In January 2013, Stevanović was transferred to Spanish side Sevilla. In July, he was sent on a season-long loan to Elche. In January 2014, he was loaned to Alavés for the remainder of campaign.

In December, Stevanović moved to Hungarian club Győr.

In September 2015, he joined Greek outfit Ergotelis.

In January 2016, he switched to Željezničar.

Servette
In July 2017, Stevanović signed a three-year deal with Swiss side Servette. He made his official debut for the team on 4 August against Rapperswil-Jona. On 10 September, he scored his first goal for Servette in a triumph over FC Schaffhausen.

In January 2019, he was named Swiss Challenge League Player of the Year for 2018.

Stevanović was instrumental in Servette's conquest of league title, his first trophy with the club, which was sealed on 10 May and earned them promotion to Swiss Super League. He had an impact of 11 goals and 14 assists.

In May, he extended his contract until June 2022.

Stevanović played his 100th game for the side against Basel on 19 July 2020.

In August 2021, he signed a new four-year deal with Servette.

He made his 200th appearance for the team on 2 March 2023 against FC Rotkreuz and managed to score a goal.

International career
Stevanović represented Bosnia and Herzegovina at all youth levels.

In May 2012, he received his first senior call-up, for friendly games against Republic of Ireland and Mexico. He debuted against the former on 26 May.

On 15 August, in a friendly game against Wales, Stevanović scored his first senior international goal.

Career statistics

Club

International

Scores and results list Bosnia and Herzegovina's goal tally first, score column indicates score after each Stevanović goal.

Honours
Borac Banja Luka
Bosnian Cup: 2009–10

Servette
Swiss Challenge League: 2018–19

Individual
Bosnian Premier League Player of the Season: 2016–17
Swiss Challenge League Player of the Year: 2018
Swiss Super League Top Assist Provider: 2021–22

References

External links

1990 births
Living people
People from Zvornik
Serbs of Bosnia and Herzegovina
Bosnia and Herzegovina footballers
Bosnia and Herzegovina youth international footballers
Bosnia and Herzegovina under-21 international footballers
Bosnia and Herzegovina international footballers
Bosnia and Herzegovina expatriate footballers
Association football wingers
FK Vojvodina players
FK Palić players
FK Borac Banja Luka players
Sevilla FC players
Elche CF players
Deportivo Alavés players
Győri ETO FC players
Ergotelis F.C. players
FK Željezničar Sarajevo players
Servette FC players
Serbian SuperLiga players
Premier League of Bosnia and Herzegovina players
La Liga players
Segunda División players
Nemzeti Bajnokság I players
Super League Greece 2 players
Swiss Challenge League players
Swiss Super League players
Expatriate footballers in Serbia
Expatriate footballers in Spain
Expatriate footballers in Hungary
Expatriate footballers in Greece
Expatriate footballers in Switzerland
Bosnia and Herzegovina expatriate sportspeople in Serbia
Bosnia and Herzegovina expatriate sportspeople in Spain
Bosnia and Herzegovina expatriate sportspeople in Hungary
Bosnia and Herzegovina expatriate sportspeople in Greece
Bosnia and Herzegovina expatriate sportspeople in Switzerland